Jane Deley (28 July 1878 – 13 July 1949) was a French painter. Her work was part of the painting event in the art competition at the 1928 Summer Olympics. She was the partner of Henri Desgrange, the director of the Tour de France.

References

1878 births
1949 deaths
20th-century French painters
French women painters
Olympic competitors in art competitions
People from Le Creusot
20th-century French women